Royce is a 1994 American television film directed by Rod Holcomb.

Premise 
Cutbacks force the closure of a secret government department, so several agents try to reverse the decision by kidnapping a senator's son.

Cast 
 Jim Belushi – Shane Royce 
 Miguel Ferrer – Gribbon
 Peter Boyle – Huggins
 Chelsea Field – Marnie Paymer
 Anthony Head – Pitlock
 Marie-Françoise Theodore – Jerri Sloan 
 Paris Jefferson – Brenda
 Jimmy McKenna – Danny Scanlon 
 Michael J. Shannon – Senator Scanlon 
 Susan Denaker – Dee Scanlon
 Christopher Fairbank – Kupchak
 William Marsh – Rafkin
 Ralph Ineson – Newfold
 Daniel Kash – Tommy McFain

Production 
The movie was shot in Los Angeles, Budapest (Hungary) and Toronto (Canada).

References

External links 

1994 television films
1994 films
Films directed by Rod Holcomb